Nateni (Natemba) is a language of the Gurma people spoken in Benin. It is named after its principal dialect; the others are Tayari (Tayaba), Kunteni (Kuntemba), Okoni (Okoma).

Writing system

The low tone is indicated with the grave accent and the high tone with the acute accent on the vowel  or the syllabic n .
The nasalization is indicated with the help of the tilde under the vowel  which can be combined with the acute or grave accent indicating the tone .

References

Languages of Benin
Gurma languages